Chilbongsan may refer to:

 Chilbongsan (North Gyeongsang), a mountain in South Korea
 Chilbongsan (South Chungcheong), a mountain in South Korea